Alan Campion is an American chemist, currently the Dow Chemical Company Endowed Professor and University Distinguished Teaching Professor at the University of Texas at Austin.

Education
BA, New College of Florida, 1972
C.Phil., UCLA, 1976
PhD, UCLA, 1976

References

Year of birth missing (living people)
Living people
University of Texas at Austin faculty
21st-century American chemists
University of California, Los Angeles alumni